Swiss Valley is a valley found in Dubuque County, Iowa. Inside the valley, is a  park and a branch of the Catfish Creek.

Etymology 
The valley was named after the original settlers to the area.

Geography 
In it is a branch of the Catfish Creek, known as the Swiss Valley Creek, flows through. A tributary of the Swiss Valley Creek, known as Monastery Creek, is reserved for trout fingerlings.

Swiss Valley Park 
Amenities at the park include a picnic area, trails, a playground, restrooms and camping.

Trout, stocked by the Iowa DNR, are fished at the park.

References 

Landforms of Dubuque County, Iowa
Valleys of the United States
Canyons and gorges of Iowa